Nacro is a social justice charity based in England and Wales, established in 1966 from the previous National Association of Discharged Prisoners’ Aid Societies, it became the largest criminal justice-related charity in England and Wales. In the 1970s Nacro also became involved in policy discussions with the British Government, particularly with the Home Office, which has responsibility for prisons and probation services. Since 2011, its strategy has focused on extending its high-level influence at government level, with commissioners, policy makers and practitioners, and increasing its partnership work.

Today, Nacro focuses its efforts on changing supporting individuals, building stronger communities and reducing crime. They support vulnerable individuals into society, offering housing, education, substance misuse recovery and advice.

Services
The charity offers a wide variety of services across England and Wales. Its services have expanded from criminal justice to also include housing, education for young people and adults, support and advice and campaigning for political changes in society.

Criminal Record Support Service

Nacro’s Criminal Record Support Service (previously known as Resettlement Advice Service or RAS) is England’s largest criminal support and advice service. Offering specialist, free and confidential support to individuals leaving prison and with current or previous convictions.

They also offer training and consultancy packages to business, practitioners and employers on hiring people with criminal records.

Housing and Housing Support

Since 1966, Nacro has developed specialist housing knowledge and expertise in delivering housing solutions for vulnerable groups. This includes people that have experienced homelessness due to challenges in the housing market, prison leavers and people who need extra support.

In June 2018, Nacro took over delivery of the Bail Accommodation and Support Service (BASS) from Home Group, formerly Stonham Home Group. Commissioned by the Ministry of Justice, BASS gives people who are eligible to be released from prison or bailed from court somewhere stable to live and the support they need to move on to an independent, crime-free future.

In 2021 Nacro introduced the Lincolnshire Nest, a specialised service providing accommodation with support to young people with complex needs or young families, aged 16 and 17, and care leavers up to 21, across Lincolnshire.

Nacro Education Centres

Nacro Education is rated Ofsted Good and provides pre-vocational and vocational study programmes, GCSE courses and employment preparation programmes for people aged 14–18 across 13 education centres in England. In 2021, 75% of all Nacro study programme learners achieved passes in their courses, achieving multiple qualifications. This is above national benchmarks which is currently 71%.

In 2015, Nacro also took over the running of Totton College, saving them from severe financial difficulty,with the aim of making Totton College a vocational centre of excellence.

Totton College also provide various apprenticeship programmes across Southampton, using their state of the art facilities for teaching practical lessons in hair and beauty, photography, music and more. The college also has a "Skills for Life" provision, educating students with complex learning and mental difficulties.

Justice

Nacro operates in 23 prisons, young offender institutions and one secure training centre, offering young and adult offenders in prisons and in the community a wide range of services to change their lives and to prevent and reduce crime and the risk of reoffending.

They also provide education and training within young offender institutions and prisons.

Health

Nacro delivers community-based contracts across substance misuse services. Its largest contract is in Wolverhampton where it runs Recovery Near You, a consolidated and integrated drug and alcohol treatment service for young people and adults.

Nacro also manages Wolverhampton 360 (W360), a substance misuse service specifically for individuals under the age of 18.

Campaigning
Over the years Nacro has campaigned to Government about various issues related to the criminal justice, housing and education sectors they work in.

End Friday releases

In 2018, Nacro launched their End Friday Releases campaign highlighting the problems caused by prisons releasing people on a Friday.

In a webinar on 20 May 2021 "How to Tackle Reoffending: A discussion with Secretary of State for Justice Rt Hon Robert Buckland MP" hosted by Nacro, it was announced that the discharge grant would be increased from £46 to £76 pound. This was the first time the discharge grant had been increased in over 20 years.

In November 2021, a debate was held in the House of Lords regarding the Friday Releases prison amendment, Nacro was mentioned as a main player in campaigning for this policy change.

Cell Street Repeat

The Cell Street Repeat campaign was initially launched in 2020 with a focus on ending people leaving prison homeless. A joint letter was sent to Prime Minister, Boris Johnson, and the Secretary of State for Justice, Robert Buckland, about accommodation for prison leavers and the Comprehensive Spending Review. The letter asked to review current policy as leaving prison homeless reduced access to support, getting a job and somewhere to live. It also increases the chances of committing further crime.

The letter was backed by many partners, including: Prison Reform Trust, The Howard League for Prison Reform, Pact, Bounce Back, Clean Break, St Giles, Switchback, Shelter and more.

In July 2021, the campaign received a relaunch, and in December 2021 Nacro released their "alternative Christmas advert", again calling on the Government to end people leaving prison homeless.

In December 2021, a Prisons Strategy White Paper was released in Parliament where the Government committed to funding temporary accommodation for all prison leavers at risk of homelessness for up to 12 weeks upon release.

Learn Without Limits

In 2021, Nacro launched the Learn Without Limits campaign. This campaign focused on supporting young people who have either faced an interrupted education throughout their lives or who come from the most disadvantaged backgrounds. Nacro asked the Government to look at the education and skills system as part of the post-COVID recovery effort.

Nacro proposed that the Pupil Premium Plus could be created for this. Introduced in 2011, it is a grant paid to schools to help reduce the attainment gap for disadvantaged school-age children. It is an existing policy lever that could be pulled by extending the funding into post-16 settings at the upcoming spending review.

Other work 
Lives Not Knives

Nacro launched the campaign Lives Not Knives in February 2020. This campaign was a movement driven by the experiences and voices of the young people that Nacro support. The aim of the campaign was to highlight the devastating effects of knife crime to individuals and families in local communities, putting forward solutions for how the Government can help to reduce knife crime.

COVID–19 Second Wave: Urgent Steps for the Justice System

During the COVID-19 pandemic, Nacro produced a policy briefing, outlining their asks to the Government for the urgent steps are required in order to ensure that the impact of COVID–19 on those in contact with the justice system is minimised. The asks included reducing overcrowding in prisons, introducing or reintroducing education work and support as well as the ask for prisoners and staff to be vaccinated.

Officials and patrons
The current Chief Executive is Campbell Robb, formerly of Shelter and The Joseph Rowntree Foundation. The Chair is Nick Hardwick.

References

External links 
 Nacro's Charity Commission page
 Nacro's Response to the Ministry of Justice's Proposals to Toughen up Community Sentences 
 Catalogue of the Nacro archives, held at the Modern Records Centre, University of Warwick

Prison charities based in the United Kingdom
Organizations established in 1918
1918 establishments in the United Kingdom
Criminal justice